Sub Lieutenant (SLt) Kumudini Tyagi is one of the first two women, along with SLt Riti Singh, to have earned their wings for operating from Indian Navy warships.

Early life 
Kumudini Tyagi was born in Ghaziabad, in 1997 to Pravesh Kumar Tyagi and Reena Tyagi. The family hails from Kharkhoda, Meerut, but moved to Ghaziabad in 1983. Her grandfather, Suresh Chand Tyagi was a sub-inspector with the Uttar Pradesh Police, and her father, Pravesh runs a security agency. Kumudini's grandmother's name is Rajesh Kumari Tyagi. She has a younger brother, Apoorv Tyagi, who has also cleared the written examination of the combined defence services. The family lives in Sanjay Nagar Sector-23, Ghaziabad

Education 
Kumudini completed her ICSE (Class X) from St. Paul's Academy, Rajnagar, and her CBSE (Class XII) from Ch.Chhabil Dass Public School. She earned her Bachelor of Technology in Computer Science from ABES Engineering College while topping the college. She was passionate about joining the defence forces, and the tragic 2015 incident in which Kiran Shekhawat was martyred, impacted her deeply. She went on to be commissioned into the Navy in December 2018, even though she had a very lucrative alternate job offer. Her family describes her as a studious, but fit girl.

Career 
Kumudini completed the 22nd Short Service Commission Observer Course from Southern Naval Command, Kochi. This included  60 hours of flying training including sorties and simulator flights. While in training, she stood first among the ladies in the Inter Squadron Novices X-Country Championship, 2019, clocking 46 min 29 sec in the 8Km run.

On September 21, 2020, Kumudini was inducted as an Observer (Airborne Tactician) in the helicopter fleet of the Indian Navy. She was among a group of 17 officers, including four women officers, and three officers of the Indian Coast Guard, who were awarded "Wings" on graduating as "Observers" at a ceremony held at INS Garuda, Kochi. Rear Admiral Antony George, Chief Staff Officer (Training), presiding over the ceremony, highlighted it as a landmark occasion. Ajay Shankar Pandey, district magistrate of Ghaziabad, commented that the district of Ghaziabad plan a felicitation for her upon return form duty. Her family was unable to attend the historic occasion due to the COVID-19 situation.

Her training includes Air Navigation, Flying Procedure, Air Warfare, Anti-Submarine Warfare. She is now training to operate a host of sensors onboard navy multi-role, or Utility Helicopters, including sonar consoles and Intelligence, Surveillance and Reconnaissance (ISR) payloads. She is likely to fly in the MH-60R Seahawk. Her deployments are expected to be on frontline Indian Navy warships including long duration missions.

See also 

 Riti Singh
Kiran Shekhawat
 Shivangi (pilot)
 Avani Chaturvedi
 Mohana Singh Jitarwal
 Bhawana Kanth
 Gunjan Saxena

References

External links 
ABES Engineering College

Indian women aviators
1997 births
Living people
Women from Uttar Pradesh
Indian Navy personnel
People from Ghaziabad, Uttar Pradesh
Indian women in war